Darko Stevanović (born 3 January 1997) is a Serbian handball player who plays for RK Eurofarm Pelister and the Serbian national team.

He participated at the 2018 European Men's Handball Championship.

References

1997 births
Living people
Serbian male handball players
Mediterranean Games competitors for Serbia
Competitors at the 2018 Mediterranean Games
21st-century Serbian people